This lists episodes of Fleksnes Fataliteter, a comedy series on Norwegian television.

Series overview

Season 1

Season 2

Season 3

Season 4

Season 5

Season 6

Season 7

Season 8

Fleksnes Fataliteter
Fleksnes Fataliteter